Rybon Art Center is an international, independent and artist-led institute based in Tehran. It was established in 2008 in order to encourage artistic innovations and experimentations among local artists and also explore possible exchange of ideas and knowledge in the field of contemporary critical art of Iran beyond ethnic and regional boundaries. During these years Rybon has initiated and conducted numerous projects including art residencies, local and international artist workshops, art shares and artist talks, screenings, enhancing local art networks and facilitating international art exchanges.

History 
Rybon started its first residency projects in collaboration with local artistic and cultural institutes, inviting established artists from neighboring countries. Holding Rybon International Artists’ Workshop based on Triangle workshops in 2012 in collaboration with Mohsen Gallery and Darbast Platform in Tehran was another step toward establishing residency culture.

Impediments for holding international residencies lead to devising a new form of residency, namely exchange programs, by Rybon. The first of these exchange programs was held in 2013 in collaboration with Organhaus Art Space of China and Mohsen Gallery in Tehran and Chongqing, China. At the present the “Exchange Program” is being successfully practiced as a pivotal part of Kooshk Residency programs.

Rybon organized the Second Rybon International Artists's Workshop in 2016 based on Triangle workshops in collaboration with Kooshk Residency, deegar platform and Gasworks. This program aimed to gather artists from all around the world to discuss and look for the possibilities to exchange ideas and knowledge beyond the ethnic, regional and artistic boundaries. Five Asian, European and African artists, as well as five Iranian artists participated in this program.

References

External links
 Rybon Art Center
 Shargh Daily | Iran-China Exchange

Culture in Tehran
Arts centres
Iranian contemporary art
Cultural organisations based in Iran